This is a list of fire departments in Virginia. The Commonwealth of Virginia is divided into 95 counties, along with 38 independent cities that are considered county-equivalents.

Counties

Accomack County

Albemarle County

Alleghany County

Amelia County

Amherst County

Appomattox County

Arlington County
Arlington County Fire Department

Augusta County

Bath County

Bedford County

Bland County

Botetourt County

Brunswick County

Buchanan County

Buckingham County

Campbell County

Caroline County

Carroll County

Charles City County

Charlotte County

Chesterfield County
Chesterfield Fire & EMS

Clarke County

Craig County

Culpeper County

Cumberland County

Dickenson County

Dinwiddie County

Essex County

Fairfax County

Fauquier County

Floyd County

Fluvanna County

Franklin County

Frederick County

Giles County

Gloucester County

Goochland County
Goochland County Fire-Rescue and Emergency Services

Grayson County

Greene County

Greensville County

Halifax County

Hanover County

Henrico County

Henry County

Highland County

Isle of Wight County

James City County

King and Queen County

King George County

King William County

Lancaster County

Lee County

Loudoun County

Louisa County

Lunenburg County

Madison County

Mathews County

Mecklenburg County

Middlesex County

Montgomery County

Nelson County

New Kent County

Northampton County

Northumberland County

Nottoway County

Orange County

Page County

Patrick County

Pittsylvania County

Powhatan County

Prince Edward County

Prince George County

Prince William County

Pulaski County

Rappahannock County

Richmond County

Roanoke County

Rockbridge County

Rockingham County

Russell County

Scott County

Shenandoah County

Smyth County

Southampton County

Spotsylvania County

Stafford County

Surrey County

Sussex County

Tazewell County

Warren County

Washington County

Westmoreland County

Wise County

Wythe County

York County

Independent Cities

Alexandria

Chesapeake

Harrisonburg

Hopewell

Lynchburg

Manassas 
While an independent city, the City of Manassas is a part of the Prince William County Fire & Rescue system.

Manassas Park 
While an independent city, the City of Manassas Park is a part of the Prince William County Fire & Rescue system.

Roanoke

Salem

Staunton

Suffolk

Virginia Beach
Virginia Beach Fire-Rescue

Airports
Metropolitan Washington Airports Authority Fire and Rescue Department – responsible for Ronald Reagan Washington National Airport and Washington Dulles International Airport, both located in Virginia

Defunct

See also

List of fire departments

References

Fire Departments
 
Virginia
Fire Departments